Graciela Abascal Compean (March 21, 1939 - August 7, 2020) was a Mexican painter.

Life 
Born in Mexico City, Abascal studied in her native city at the Universidad Iberoamericana for three years; she spent ten years studying painting with José Márquez Figueroa from the Academy of Fine Arts in Puebla and five years with Carlos Orozco Romero, as well as with the guidance of David Alfaro Siqueiros through her career.

She was a figurative artist, but her work occasionally incorporated surrealistic elements. Her work has been shown in many solo and group exhibitions both in Mexico and abroad.

References

1939 births
2020 deaths
20th-century Mexican painters
21st-century Mexican painters
Mexican women painters
20th-century Mexican women artists
21st-century Mexican women artists
Artists from Mexico City
Universidad Iberoamericana alumni